Annie B. Bond (formerly Annie Berthold-Bond) was born in Rhinebeck, New York (where she currently lives) in 1983. Bond is a green-living advocate, author, editor, entrepreneur, and consultant. She is currently the editor-in-chief of The Wellness Wire. She is also the founder of Terraspheres.com and ATrueFind.com. Bond has written five books on green living and was named "the foremost expert on green living" by Body & Soul magazine in 2009.

Background 
At a interview in 2013, Bond stated that she was poisoned by a gas leak at a restaurant, where she was employed, in 1980. The leak sent her and 80 people to the hospital, where she was diagnosed with permanent central nervous system damage. Her apartment building was soon exterminated with a pesticide which she said was later taken off the market because it was neurotoxic. She was diagnosed with atypical manic depression.

Bond was put under the care of Dr. Leo Galland, one of the first environmental medicine MDs, who diagnosed her with organophosphate pesticide poisoning and multiple chemical sensitivity (a controversial condition not widely recognized). Since then, Bond has made green living her career due to her perceived necessity of living without chemicals.

In 1988, Bond gave birth to her only child, Lily Berthold-Bond, who also writes about green living.

Books 
Bond is the author of five books on green living. Her first book, Clean and Green: The Complete Guide to Non-Toxic and Environmentally Safe Housekeeping, was published in 1990. It was a best seller.

Her second book, The Green Kitchen Handbook, was published in 1997 with a foreword written by Meryl Streep. Better Basics for the Home: Simple Solutions for Less Toxic Living, her third book, was published in 1999 and Home Enlightenment, her fourth book, was published in 2005.

In 2010, Bond collaborated with Melissa Breyer and Wendy Gordon (foreword by Alice Waters) on the book True Food: Eight Simple Steps to a Healthier You. True Food was published by National Geographic and won the 2010 Gourmand Award as one of the Best Health and Nutrition Books in the Lifestyle, Body and World category.

Career 
Bond has been recognized as an expert in green living. In addition to her five books, Bond was the founder and editor-in-chief of "Green Alternatives for Health and the Environment" from 1989 to 1994. From 1994 to 1996, she was the editor-in-chief for "The Green Guide," which was published by Mothers & Others for a Livable Planet and is now owned by National Geographic.

Between 2000 and 2008, Bond was the Executive producer of Healthy and Green Living for Care2.com, where she authored over 4,000 blogs. Her newsletters reached 1.8 million subscribers.

Bond has also written blogs and articles for Gaiam, Intent, and Body & Soul, among others. She partnered with alternative medicine specialist Deepak Chopra on a featured blog for The Huffington Post. In 2007, Bond served as the spokesperson for Maid Brigade, as well as serving as a consult for the company.

According to Chopra, "Bond offers a practical guide to create well-being for our home, our environment, and our planet. Follow her advice and both you and our planet will be healthier."

Bond has now launched The True Find for her "Ask Annie B." column and other writings, as well as Bondify Media, a content marketing agency.

References

External links 
 Ask Annie B. and The True Find columns
 Annie B. Bond's personal website
 Annie B. Bond's profile at Care2.com
 Bondify Media

1953 births
Living people
American non-fiction writers
HuffPost writers and columnists
American women columnists
21st-century American women writers
American women non-fiction writers